The Church of the Santo Sepolcro (Italian: Chiesa del Santo Sepolcro, literally "Church of the Holy Sepulchre") is a religious edifice in Pisa, Tuscany, Italy.

Built in the early 12th century (it is known at least from 1113), it was designed by Diotisalvi, who also designed the Baptistery of Pisa Cathedral forty years later. It has an octagonal plan and, until the 16th century, it was surrounded by a portico. The central tambour, supported by eight ogival arches, is super-elevated and is surmounted by a conic cusp. 

The attribution to the Holy Sepulchre is a reference to the latter's relics which were carried in Pisa by archbishop Dagobert after his participation to the First Crusade. The structure resembles indeed the Dome of the Rock in Jerusalem, conquered by the crusaders in 1099.

The portals have decorations with animals and lions' heads in marble. The interior, restored in 1720 in Baroque style, was destroyed in the 19th century. What remains include a bust-reliquary of St. Ubaldesca (15th century) with a pail which, according to the tradition, belonged to the saint; the tombstone of Marie Mancini, Mazarin's niece; and a 15th-century panel of the Madonna with Child.

The unfinished small bell tower is in Pisane-Romanesque style, with rectangular plan.

References

Notes

Roman Catholic churches in Pisa
Knights Hospitaller
12th-century Roman Catholic church buildings in Italy
Octagonal churches in Italy